The 1980–81 season was Stoke City's 74th season in the Football League and 48th in the First Division.

The 1980–81 campaign was a transitional one for Stoke with a number of players coming and going. The team made a poor start and in their first four matches conceded twelve goals. They slowly recovered and were easily able to pull themselves away from any fears of being involved in a relegation battle and finished in a mid-table position of 11th. It was a pretty uneventful season, and with 18 draws often a boring one, for the supporters.

Season review

League
In the Summer of 1980 there were some more comings and goings. Firstly Mr Percy Axon became chairman while striker Garth Crooks moved to Tottenham Hotspur for a club record £650,000 and goalkeeper Roger Jones joined Derby County. With cash in the bank, Durban signed left back Peter Hampton from Leeds United for £170,000 and Paul Maguire joined from Shrewsbury Town for £262,000. Iain Munro and Peter Griffiths also joined the club. The team made an awful start to the 1980–81 season losing 5–1 at Norwich City and then 5–0 at Nottingham Forest.

Stoke soon started to grind out results and Alan Durban's well drilled side picked up the points they needed to pull away from any danger and they finished the season in 11th place with 42 points.

FA Cup
Stoke drew Staffordshire rivals Wolverhampton Wanderers in the third round and after a 2–2 draw at home Wolves won 2–1 in the replay.

League Cup
Stoke lost to Manchester City 4–1 over two legs, drawing 1–1 at home but suffering a 3–0 defeat at Maine Road.

Final league table

Results

Stoke's score comes first

Legend

Football League First Division

FA Cup

League Cup

Friendlies

Squad statistics

References

Stoke City F.C. seasons
Stoke